Charles Henry Smith (born January 18, 1946) is a former American football running back.  He played two seasons for the American Football League (AFL)'s Oakland Raiders (1968–1969), and 5 for the National Football League (NFL)'s Raiders (1970–1974). He also played for the NFL's San Diego Chargers in 1975.  He attended Castlemont High School in Oakland, California, and then University of Utah.

Smith scored the go-ahead touchdown in the famous 1968 Heidi Game between the Raiders and New York Jets. Most of the country didn't see the touchdown because NBC had cut away from the game, at 7 pm, to the film Heidi.

See also
Other American Football League players

1946 births
Living people
Sportspeople from Natchez, Mississippi
Players of American football from Mississippi
American football running backs
Utah Utes football players
Oakland Raiders players
San Diego Chargers players
American Football League players